Major-General Henry Charles Darling (Uppingham, 28 February 1780 – 11 February 1845) was a Major General in the British Army and served as Lieutenant Governor of Tobago (1833–45).

Darling served with the Army in Annapolis Royal in the Colony of Nova Scotia around 1809.

Born in England, Darling married before 1808 to Isabella Cameron, the eldest daughter of Charles Cameron, former Governor of the Bahamas and Lady Margaret Hay.

He was brother of General Sir Ralph Darling and was father to Sir Charles Henry Darling, Knight Commander of the KCB.

External links

1780 births
1845 deaths
British Army major generals
Knights Commander of the Order of the Bath
Governors of British Tobago
People from Uppingham